Geordan Dupire (born 28 September 1993) is a French footballer who plays as a goalkeeper for R.E. Virton in the Belgian First Division B.

Career

Virton
Dupire joined Belgian club R.E. Virton in July 2016. He made his league debut for the club on 3 September 2016 in a 3–0 away victory over Geel. On 10 October 2018, Dupire signed a new three-year contract with the club.

References

External links

1993 births
Living people
Sportspeople from Valenciennes
FC Lorient players
R.A.E.C. Mons players
US Boulogne players
R.E. Virton players
Belgian Third Division players
Challenger Pro League players
French footballers
Association football goalkeepers
Footballers from Hauts-de-France
Expatriate footballers in Belgium
French expatriate sportspeople in Belgium
French expatriate footballers